Pezinok District (okres Pezinok) is a district in
the Bratislava Region of western Slovakia The district had been established in 1996, from 1923 was its area part of Modra District. It is situated on the foothills of Little Carpathians hills, and is known for its vineyard production. Industry is located mostly in its seat, town of Pezinok, which is the largest district municipality. Of cultural importance is town Modra. Many inhabitants daily travel to Bratislava for work, shopping, or education.

Municipalities

References

 
Districts of Slovakia